The North Central Conference was an OHSAA athletic league whose final remaining members were located in northwest and north-central Ohio.  The league's last day of operation was June 30, 2014.

The following schools were members at the time the league folded:

Former members

League history
The conference's first year was in the 1962-63 school year.  The original members were:  Buckeye Central, Colonel Crawford, Elgin, Mohawk, Pleasant, Ridgedale, River Valley and Riverdale.  Carey and Wynford joined the NCC for the 1963-64 school year.

The league remained consistent until the 1990-91 school year when Elgin, Pleasant, Ridgedale and River Valley joined the newly formed Mid-Ohio Athletic Conference; Carey and Mohawk left for the Midland Athletic League; while Crestline, Fredericktown and Ontario joined the NCC.  Lucas joined the NCC for the 1998-99 school year, while Fredericktown left for the Mid-Buckeye Conference in 1999-00.  Bucyrus joined the NCC for the 2002-03 school year, bringing the NCC to an eight team format.

Upper Sandusky High School and Galion High School were voted in as the league's ninth and tenth members on February 5 and March 4 of 2009.  Both began league competition for the 2011-12 school year.

In September 2011, the NCC was contacted by Loudonville and Willard for potential membership down the road.  Loudonville's league was going to be down to two members in 2013 and Willard's shrinking enrollment had them considering options outside of the Northern Ohio League.  Willard ultimately decided to remain in the NOL.

On December 1, 2011, Bucyrus, Buckeye Central, Colonel Crawford, Crestline, Riverdale, and Wynford announced they would be leaving the NCC to help form the new Northern 10 Athletic Conference in 2014 with Carey, Mohawk, Seneca East and Ridgedale.  With just 4 members remaining (Galion, Lucas, Ontario, and Upper Sandusky) the league subsequently folded after the 2013-14 school year on June 30, 2014.

Both Upper Sandusky and Galion were invited to join the Mid-Ohio Athletic Conference in early 2012 as Red Division members, with both schools intended to replace Ridgedale in 2014. On February 26, 2012, Lucas announced it would leave the NCC a year before the league dissolved.  They applied to join the Mid-Buckeye Conference and were granted membership for 2013.  Ontario also announced in March 2012 that they would join the Northern Ohio League in 2013.

In April 2013, Riverdale was invited to join the Blanchard Valley Conference (BVC), which is primarily made up of other schools located in Hancock County.  Riverdale accepted the invitation and joined the BVC before the N10 began athletic competition.  As a result of Riverdale's departure from its N10 commitment, and despite a report that Upper Sandusky will bypass joining the Mid-Ohio Athletic Conference, the Rams will play the fall season in the MOAC before moving to the Northern 10 in the winter of the 2014-15 school year.

Football champions

Championships by school

References

External links
NCC Basketball Standings
NOL Shifting

Ohio high school sports conferences